EGFR-coamplified and overexpressed protein, also known as ECOP, is a human gene.

References

Further reading